The following is a list of museums with major collections of Egyptian antiquities:

Museum collections with specified number

5,000+ 
 Grand Egyptian Museum, Giza, Egypt: Over 100,000 artifacts (due to being partly opened in 2018, currently housed in the Egyptian Museum, Cairo)
 British Museum, London, England, UK: Over 100,000 artifacts (not including the 2001 donation of the six million artifact Wendorf Collection of Egyptian and Sudanese Prehistory)
 Ägyptisches Museum, Neues Museum, Berlin, Germany: About 80,000 artifacts
 Petrie Museum of Egyptian Archaeology, London, England, UK: About 80,000 artifacts
 Musée du Louvre, Paris, France: 77,404 artifacts
 National Museum of Egyptian Civilization, Cairo Egypt: 50,000 artifacts
 Boston Museum of Fine Arts, Boston, Massachusetts, USA: About 45,000 artifacts
 Kelsey Museum of Archaeology, Ann Arbor, Michigan, USA: Over 45,000 artifacts
 University of Pennsylvania Museum of Archaeology and Anthropology, Philadelphia, Pennsylvania, USA: Over 42,000 artifacts
 Ashmolean Museum, Oxford, England, UK: About 40,000 artifacts
 Museo Egizio, Turin, Italy: 32,500 artifacts
 Oriental Institute, Chicago, Illinois, USA: About 30,000 artifacts
 Metropolitan Museum of Art, New York City, New York, USA: About 26,000 artifacts
 Royal Ontario Museum, Toronto, Ontario, Canada: 25,000 artifacts
 Hearst Museum of Anthropology, Berkeley, California, USA: Over 17,000 artifacts
 Fitzwilliam Museum, Cambridge, England, UK: Over 16,000 artifacts
 World Museum, Liverpool, England, UK: Over 16,000 artifacts
 Manchester Museum, Manchester, England, UK: About 16,000 artifacts
 Egyptian Museum, Florence, Italy: Over 14,000 artifacts
 Kunsthistorisches Museum, Vienna, Austria: Over 17,000 artifacts
 Cinquantenaire Museum, Brussels, Belgium: Over 11,000 artifacts
 Rijksmuseum van Oudheden, Leiden, The Netherlands: Over 9,000 artifacts
 Pushkin Museum of Fine Arts, Moscow, Russia: More than 8,000 artifacts
 Staatliche Sammlung für Ägyptische Kunst, Munich, Germany About 8,000 artifacts
 Roemer- und Pelizaeus-Museum Hildesheim, Hildesheim, Germany: 8,000 artifacts
 Ägyptisches Museum der Universität Leipzig, Leipzig, Saxony, Germany: About 8,000 artifacts
Michael C. Carlos Museum, Atlanta, Georgia, USA: 7,500 objects
 Durham University Oriental Museum, Durham, England, UK: Over 6,700 artifacts
 National Archaeological Museum, Athens, Greece: Over 6,000 artifacts
 National Museum in Warsaw (MNW), Warsaw, Poland: 6,000 artifacts
 National Museum of Scotland, Edinburgh, Scotland, UK: 6,000 artifacts
 The Hermitage, St Petersburg, Russia: Over 5,500 artifacts
 Birmingham Museum and Art Gallery, Birmingham, England, UK: About 8, 000 artifacts

Over 1,000 
 Peabody Museum of Natural History, New Haven, Connecticut, USA: Over 5,000 artifacts
 The Egypt Centre, Swansea University, Swansea, Wales, UK: Over 5,000 artifacts
 Kelvingrove Art Gallery and Museum, Glasgow, Scotland, UK: 5,000 artifacts
 Musée des Confluences, Lyon, France: Over 4,900 artifacts
 Museum of Fine Arts, Budapest, Hungary: Over 4,000 artifacts
 Rosicrucian Egyptian Museum, San Jose, California, USA: Over 4,000 artifacts
 Field Museum, Chicago, Illinois, USA: Over 3,500 artifacts
 Museo Civico Archeologico, Bologna, Italy: About 3,500 artifacts
 Brooklyn Museum, Brooklyn, New York, USA: More than 3,000 artifacts
 National Museum of Ireland, Dublin, Ireland: About 3,000 artifacts
 Carnegie Museum of Natural History, Pittsburgh, Pennsylvania, USA: More than 2,500 artifacts
 Naples National Archaeological Museum, Naples, Italy: 2,500 artifacts
 Hunterian Museum and Art Gallery, Glasgow, Scotland, UK: 2,300 artifacts
 Ny Carlsberg Glyptotek, Copenhagen, Denmark: More than 1,900 artifacts
 National Museum of Natural History, Washington, District of Columbia, USA: More than 1,900 artifacts
 Los Angeles County Museum of Art, Los Angeles, California, USA: More than 1,600 artifacts
 Musée des Beaux-Arts de Lyon, Lyon, France: 1,500 artifacts
 Art Museum of the University of Memphis, Memphis, Tennessee, USA: More than 1,400 artifacts
 , Barcelona, Spain: 1,100 artifacts
 Cleveland Museum of Art, Cleveland, Ohio, USA: More than 1000 artifacts
 Freer Gallery of Art, Washington, District of Columbia, USA: More than 1,000 artifacts
 Australian Museum, Sydney, New South Wales, Australia: Over 1,000 artifacts
 Prewitt–Allen Archaeological Museum, Salem, Oregon, USA; over 900 artifacts

Over 100 
 Maidstone Museum, Kent, England: over 600 artifacts
Leicester Museum & Art Gallery, Leicester, England, UK: Over 400 artifacts
Odessa Archeological Museum, Odessa, Ukraine: Over 400 artifacts
Weston Park Museum, Sheffield, England: over 300 artifacts
North Carolina Museum of Art, Raleigh, North Carolina; 38 artifacts

Other significant collections with unspecified number of artifacts 
Sudan National Museum, Khartoum, Sudan: (3 relocated temples due to the flooding of Lake Nasser + other artifacts from the area of the third cataract)
Abbey Museum of Art and Archaeology, Caboolture, Queensland, Australia
Alexandria National Museum, Alexandria, Egypt
Allard Pierson Museum, Amsterdam, Netherlands 
American Museum of Natural History, New York City, New York, USA 
Anniston Museum of Natural History, Anniston, Alabama, USA
Antikenmuseum Basel und Sammlung Ludwig, Basel, Switzerland
Australian National University Classics Museum, Canberra, Australian Capital Territory, Australia 
Bass Museum, Miami Beach, Florida, USA
Bible Lands Museum, Jerusalem
The Box, Plymouth, Devon, England
Brighton Museum & Art Gallery, Brighton, England, UK
Canterbury Museum, Christchurch, New Zealand
Chau Chak Wing Museum, University of Sydney, New South Wales, Australia
The Children's Museum of Indianapolis, Indianapolis, Indiana, USA
Chrysler Museum of Art, Norfolk, Virginia, USA 
Denver Museum of Nature and Science, Denver, Colorado, USA 
Egyptian Museum, Milan, Italy
Egyptian Museum of Mississauga, Mississauga, Ontario, Canada
Fleming Museum of Art, Burlington, Vermont, USA
Garstang Museum of Archaeology, University of Liverpool, England
Gulbenkian Museum, Lisbon, Portugal
Houston Museum of Natural Science, Houston, Texas, USA 
Indian Museum, Kolkata, Kolkata, India
Israel Museum, Jerusalem
Imhotep Museum, Saqqara, Egypt
Iziko South African Museum, Cape Town, South Africa
Johns Hopkins Archaeological Museum, Baltimore, Maryland
Museum August Kestner, Hanover, Germany
Kimbell Art Museum, Fort Worth, Texas, USA
Krannert Art Museum, Champaign, Illinois, USA
Leeds City Museum, Leeds, England
Luxor Museum, Luxor, Egypt
McClung Museum of Natural History and Culture, University of Tennessee, Knoxville, Tennessee, USA
Medusa Ancient Art, Montreal, Quebec, Canada 
Milwaukee Public Museum, Milwaukee, Wisconsin, USA 
Musée d'Art et d'Histoire, Geneva, Switzerland
Musée royal de Mariemont, Morlanwelz, Belgium
Museum für Kunst und Gewerbe Hamburg, Hamburg, Germany
National Archaeology Museum, Lisbon, Portugal
Museo Gregoriano Egiziano, Vatican City
Museum of Ancient Orient, Istanbul, Turkey
Museum of New Zealand Te Papa Tongarewa, Wellington, New Zealand 
National Gallery of Victoria, Melbourne, Victoria, Australia 
Nelson-Atkins Museum of Art, Kansas City, Missouri, USA
The Newark Museum of Art, Newark, New Jersey, USA 
Oriental Institute, University of Chicago, Illinois, USA
Redpath Museum, McGill University, Montreal, Quebec, Canada 
Rhode Island School of Design Museum, Providence. Rhode Island, USA 
Robert and Frances Fullerton Museum of Art, California State University, San Bernardino, California, USA
San Antonio Museum of Art, San Antonio, Texas, USA
Museum of Us, San Diego, California, USA 
Harvard Museum of the Ancient Near East, Cambridge, Massachusetts, USA 
Sir John Soane's Museum, London, England, UK
South Australian Museum, North Terrace, Adelaide, South Australia, Australia
Virginia Museum of Fine Arts, Richmond, Virginia, USA'
Wadsworth Atheneum, Hartford, Connecticut, USA
Western Australian Museum, Perth, Western Australia, Australia

Other or Minor Collections 

 Albany Institute of History and Art, Albany, New York, USA
 Grand Rapids Public Museum, Grand Rapids, Michigan, USA
 Kalamazoo Valley Museum, Kalamazoo, Michigan
 Louisiana Art and Science Museum, Baton Rouge, Louisiana
 Museum of Antiquities (University of Saskatchewan), Saskatoon, Saskatchewan, Canada
 Museum of Old and New Art, Hobart, Tasmania, Australia 
 Otago Museum, Dunedin, New Zealand
 Reading Public Museum, West Reading, Pennsylvania, USA
 Wayne County Historical Museum, Richmond, Indiana, USA

See also 

 List of museums with Egyptian Mummies on display

References

Egypt
Egyptian Antiquities
Egyptian Antiquities
Museums
Ancient Egypt-related lists